The 1943–44 Utah Redskins men's basketball team represented the University of Utah during the 1943–44 NCAA men's basketball season. The Redskins captured the Mountain States Conference championship and its only national championship.

Utah was given an opportunity to compete in the NCAA tournament through an unusual circumstance. The University of Arkansas Razorbacks squad, who were supposed to appear in the tournament, were victimized by an automobile accident. Prior to the tournament, two of Arkansas’ starters were injured when their station wagon broke down after returning from a scrimmage in Fort Smith, Arkansas. While attempting to fix a flat tire, Deno Nichols and Ben Jones were injured when another car rammed into the back of the station wagon. Both players were injured. The severity of the accident caused Arkansas to withdraw from the upcoming NCAA tournament and the Redskins were tapped as a replacement.

Schedule and results

|-
!colspan=12 style=|Regular Season

|-
!colspan=12 style=| NIT

|-
!colspan=12 style=| NCAA tournament

|-
!colspan=12 style=| Red Cross Benefit Game

Postseason

National Invitation Tournament
Utah competed in the 1944 National Invitation Tournament and lost its quarterfinal match.
Quarterfinal
Kentucky 46, Utah 38

NCAA tournament
In need of a replacement, the NCAA committee turned to Utah, despite the fact that the Redskins had 4 losses and had just lost their first-round game in the NIT tournament. Utah had one player, Lyman Condie, a medical student, who midway through the season quit the team to pursue medical school. Additionally, all of Utah's players were raised within 30 miles of the Utah campus. These players included Arnie Ferrin, Fred Sheffield, and Wat Misaka, who was of Japanese descent.

West
Utah 45, Missouri 35
Final Four
Utah 40, Iowa State 31
Championship
Utah 42, Dartmouth 40 (OT)

Awards and honors
 Arnie Ferrin, NCAA Men's MOP Award

References

Utah Redskins
Utah
Utah Utes men's basketball seasons
Utah
NCAA Division I men's basketball tournament Final Four seasons
NCAA Division I men's basketball tournament championship seasons